Trinity Sunday is the first Sunday after Pentecost in the Western Christian liturgical calendar, and the Sunday of Pentecost in Eastern Christianity. Trinity Sunday celebrates the Christian doctrine of the Trinity, the three Persons of God: the Father, the Son, and the Holy Spirit.

Western Christianity

Trinity Sunday is celebrated in all the Western liturgical churches: Latin Catholic, Anglican, Lutheran, Presbyterian, United Church of Christ, and Methodist.

History
In the early Church, no special Office or day was assigned for the Holy Trinity. When the Arian heresy was spreading, the Fathers prepared an Office with canticles, responses, a Preface, and hymns, to be recited on Sundays. In the Sacramentary of St. Gregory the Great there are prayers and the Preface of the Trinity. During the Middle Ages, especially during the Carolingian period, devotion to the Blessed Trinity was a highly important feature of private devotion and inspired several liturgical expressions. Sundays are traditionally dedicated to the Holy Trinity.

The Micrologies written during the pontificate of Gregory VII list no special Office for the Sunday after Pentecost, but add that in some places they recited the Office of the Holy Trinity composed by Bishop Stephen of Liège (903–920). By others the Office was said on the Sunday before Advent. Alexander II (1061–1073), refused a petition for a special feast on the grounds that such a feast was not customary in the Roman Church which daily honoured the Holy Trinity by the Gloria Patri, etc., but he did not forbid the celebration where it already existed. A new Office had been made by the Franciscan John Peckham, Canon of Lyons, later Archbishop of Canterbury (d. 1292).

John XXII (1316–1334) ordered the feast for the entire Church on the first Sunday after Pentecost and established it as a Double of the Second Class. It was raised to the dignity of a primary of the first class, 24 July 1911, by Pope Pius X (Acta Ap. Sedis, III, 351). Since it was after the first great Pentecost that the doctrine of the Trinity was proclaimed to the world, the feast becomingly follows that of Pentecost.

Catholicism
In the Catholic Church, it is officially known as the Solemnity of the Most Holy Trinity. Prior to the reforms of the Second Vatican Council, it marked the end of a three-week period during which church weddings were forbidden. The period began on Rogation Sunday, the fifth Sunday after Easter. The prescribed liturgical color is white.

In the traditional Divine Office, the Athanasian Creed (Quicumque vult) is said on this day at Prime. Before 1960, it was said on all Sundays after Epiphany and Pentecost which do not fall within Octaves or on which a feast of Double rank or higher was celebrated or commemorated, as well as on Trinity Sunday. The 1960 reforms reduced it to once a year, on this Sunday.

In the 1962 Missal, the Mass for the First Sunday After Pentecost is not said or commemorated on Sunday (it is permanently impeded there by Trinity Sunday), but is used during the week if the ferial Mass is being said.

The Thursday after Trinity Sunday is observed as the Feast of Corpus Christi. In some countries, including the United States, Canada, and Spain, it may be celebrated on the following Sunday, when the faithful are more likely to attend Mass and be able to celebrate the feast.

Lutheranism
A distinctive feature of Lutheran worship is the recitation of the Athanasian Creed on Trinity Sunday during Matins. It may also supplant the Nicene Creed during the Mass. The Lutheran Book of Worship, Lutheran Worship, and Lutheran Service Book specify this.

Anglicanism

The Athanasian Creed, although not often used, is recited in certain Anglican churches, particularly those of High Church tendency. Its use is prescribed in the 1662 Book of Common Prayer of the Church of England for use on certain Sundays at Morning Prayer, including Trinity Sunday, and it is found in many modern Anglican prayer books. It is in the Historical Documents section of the 1979 Book of Common Prayer (Episcopal Church), but its use is not specifically provided for in the rubrics of that prayer book.

Trinity Sunday has the status of a Principal Feast in the Church of England and is one of seven principal feast days in the Episcopal Church (United States).

Thomas Becket (1118–1170) was consecrated Archbishop of Canterbury on the Sunday after Pentecost (Whitsun), and his first act was to ordain that the day of his consecration should be held as a new festival in honour of the Holy Trinity.  This observance spread from Canterbury throughout the whole of western Christendom.

Anglican parishes with an Anglo-Catholic churchmanship observe Corpus Christi on the following Thursday, or in some cases the following Sunday.

Methodism
In traditional Methodist usage, The Book of Worship for Church and Home (1965) provides the following Collects for Trinity Sunday:

Dates
Trinity Sunday is the Sunday following Pentecost, and eight weeks after Easter Sunday. The earliest possible date is May 17 (as in 1818 and 2285). The latest possible date is June 20 (as in 1943 and 2038).

Eastern Christianity

In the Eastern Orthodox and Eastern Catholic churches, the Sunday of Pentecost itself is called Trinity Sunday (the Sunday after Pentecost is All Saints Sunday). The Monday after Pentecost is called Monday of the Holy Spirit, and the next day is called the Third Day of the Trinity. Though liturgical colours are not as fixed in the Eastern practice (normally there are simply "festive" colours and "somber" or Lenten colours), in some churches, green is used for Pentecost and its Afterfeast.

Bach cantatas
Johann Sebastian Bach composed a number of cantatas for Trinity Sunday. Three of them are extant, including O heilges Geist- und Wasserbad, BWV 165, Es ist ein trotzig und verzagt Ding, BWV 176, and Gelobet sei der Herr, mein Gott, BWV 129. The cantata Höchsterwünschtes Freudenfest, BWV 194, composed for dedication of the church and organ at Störmthal, was performed again in Leipzig for Trinity Sunday, first on 4 June 1724, a shortened version in 1726, and the complete version in 1731.

References

External links

All About Trinity Sunday

Christian Sunday observances
May observances
June observances
Pentecost
Holidays based on the date of Easter